William Williams (1727 – 27 April 1791) was a Welsh-American painter who wrote a novel, The Journal of Llewellin Penrose, Seaman, considered by many to be the first American novel.

Early life
Williams was born in Bristol, England, but his family originated in Caerphilly, Wales.

Seafaring and Penrose

Williams is believed to have been a seafarer during the early part of his life. During that time he became a friend and shipmate of William Falconer. Williams wrote The Journal of Llewellin Penrose, Seaman, believed to be partly autobiographical, about a sailor who is cast away in the New World. This book is accounted by many scholars as the first American novel. Williams could not find a publisher for the book, however, because its clearly fictional elements did not fit in with the then-current vogue for true travel tales. The novel was not published until 1815, and then only in a revised form. The original text was not published until 1969.

Artistic career
He began living in Philadelphia around 1747 after his time at sea. In Philadelphia he was instrumental in building America's first theater, maintained an art studio at "The Sign of Hogarth's Head" and taught art to a young Benjamin West, among others. West later credited Williams as giving him his interest in painting.

Williams associated with Benjamin Franklin, Franklin's partner, David Hall, patriot and intellectual, Benjamin Lay and with William and Lewis Hallam. Travelling with the Hallam Company he lived for a time in Jamaica and afterwards in New York City, where he was married to Mary Mare, the sister of artist John Mare, Jr.

Williams returned to England in 1776, where he lived in London for some time and renewed his friendship with Benjamin West. He subsequently returned to Bristol where he painted for several years before falling on hard times.

Death
He died in the Merchants' and Sailors' Almshouse in Bristol in 1791.

Williams left his personal property to Thomas Eagles, a gentleman who helped him gain admission to the almshouse, where he lived until his death.  The bequest included many books, a self-portrait (now in the Winterthur Museum) and the manuscript of Penrose. The Rev. John Eagles, son of Thomas, prepared an edited copy of this for publication, including 37 watercolours mainly by Nicholas Pocock, intended for engraving. This Eagles version appeared in 1815, but without the illustrations, and in 2006 its manuscript was acquired by the National Maritime Museum, Greenwich, UK. Williams' original manuscript, bequeathed to Eagles senior, is at the Indiana University at Bloomington. The manuscript was transcribed and published in 1969 by David Howard Dickason.

Descendants
William and Mary had one son, William Joseph Williams, born in New York City in 1759. William Joseph Williams became a painter as well, and is considered the first American portraitist.

See also 
Robinson Crusoe

References

External links 

 Brief biography

1727 births
1791 deaths
18th-century English painters
English male painters
18th-century American painters
18th-century American male artists
American male painters
Artists from Bristol
18th-century American novelists
18th-century American male writers
American male novelists
American portrait painters
American people of Welsh descent
18th-century English male artists